Russell C. Deyo is an American lawyer and government official. Appointed Under Secretary for Management at the Department of Homeland Security (DHS) on  May 11, 2015, he became the Acting Deputy Secretary of Homeland Security (DHS) on November 1, 2016.

Early life and education
Deyo graduated from Dartmouth College. He earned his J.D. from Georgetown University Law Center. At Georgetown, he was executive editor of the school's International Law Journal.

Career
From 1977 to 1978, Deyo was an attorney at the New York City law firm Patterson, Belknap, Webb & Tyler. He was subsequently an Assistant U.S. Attorney for the District of New Jersey from 1978 to 1985. The last three years he was Chief of Special Prosecutions.

Deyo worked at Johnson & Johnson for 27 years, with positions such as general counsel and vice president of administration. He oversaw human resources, procurement, contributions, philanthropy, legal affairs and compliance. He was also on the management boards of several Johnson & Johnson operating companies. According to DHS, he oversaw "the Office of Corporate Secretary, Government Affairs and Policy, Privacy, Security and Aviation." For 16 years he was a member of the Johnson & Johnson executive committee. He retired from the company in 2012.

Deyo became Under Secretary for Management at DHS on May 11, 2015, with oversight of the department's management programs. He served as the Acting Deputy Secretary of Homeland Security from November 1, 2016 to April 4, 2017.

References

External links
DHS biography

21st-century American lawyers
Year of birth missing (living people)
Living people
Dartmouth College alumni
Georgetown University Law Center alumni
Johnson & Johnson people
Obama administration personnel
Patterson Belknap Webb & Tyler people
Trump administration personnel
United States Deputy Secretaries of Homeland Security